Chiyayoc is a small village in northwestern Argentina. It is part of the Iruya Department in the Salta Province. The village is located at an elevation of 3100 meters, 4 km east of the village of Salta and 9 km north of the village of Iruya.

Chiyayoc is part of the Finca el Potrero and has a school with about 30 children. The village lives from agriculture and tourism. It is easily accessible from Iruya in a six hours walk.

External links
 Photo of Chiyayoc

References 

Populated places in Salta Province